The 2007–08 Buffalo Sabres season was the 38th season of operation, 37th season of play, for the National Hockey League franchise that was established on May 22, 1970.

Prior to the season, the Sabres lost their co-captains of the previous two seasons, Daniel Briere and Chris Drury.  Briere and Drury were signed as free agents on July 1 by the Philadelphia Flyers and New York Rangers, respectively.  Dainius Zubrus was also lost to free agency, as he was signed by the New Jersey Devils on July 3.  Thomas Vanek, who led the team in goals the previous season with 43, was a restricted free agent and was almost lost as well; the Edmonton Oilers signed him to a seven-year, $50 million offer sheet on July 6, but the Sabres matched the offer, retaining him.

Jocelyn Thibault was signed to the Sabres' roster on July 5 to serve as a veteran backup to the team's starting goaltender, Ryan Miller. Thibault replaced Ty Conklin, who had served as Miller's backup for the last month of the 2006–07 season and during the playoffs. Conklin was signed by the Pittsburgh Penguins on July 18.

After losing both Briere and Drury in the off-season, the Sabres' captaincy was vacated.  Prior to the season, the team announced that it would rotate captaincy throughout the season, just as it did during the 2003–04 season.  Jochen Hecht was named the October captain under this system.  Toni Lydman was named captain for November, Brian Campbell was named captain for December, and Jaroslav Spacek was named captain for January  before the captaincy was cycled back to Hecht in February.  Jason Pominville was named the team's captain in March, and he finished the season in the role.

Longtime Sabres' color commentator Jim Lorentz retired just prior to the season.  He was replaced in the broadcast booth by longtime Hockey Night in Canada broadcaster Harry Neale.

The Sabres' January 1 home game against the Pittsburgh Penguins was played outdoors at Ralph Wilson Stadium, home of the National Football League's Buffalo Bills.  The NHL called the event the AMP Energy NHL Winter Classic.  In addition to selling tickets at Ralph Wilson Stadium, the Sabres also sold tickets to HSBC Arena for the game, which was broadcast for fans on the arena's video scoreboard.

Brian Campbell was the Sabres' lone representative in the 2008 NHL All-Star Game, as he was named to the team as a reserve defenseman.  It was his second consecutive All-Star Game appearance. Campbell was then traded to the San Jose Sharks on February 26 in exchange for Steve Bernier and a first-round pick in the 2008 NHL Entry Draft.

Regular season
On January 18, 2008, the Sabres defeated the Atlanta Thrashers at home by a score of 10–1. Derek Roy and Drew Stafford each had a hat-trick. It was the first time that an NHL team had scored 10 goals in a regular season game since January 4, 2007, when the Toronto Maple Leafs defeated the Boston Bruins on the road by a score of 10–2. It was also the first time that the Sabres had scored 10 goals in a game since January 14, 2006, when they defeated the Los Angeles Kings at home by a score of 10–1. Coincidentally, two Sabres had hat-tricks in that game as well: Jochen Hecht and Jason Pominville.

Divisional standings

Conference standings

For complete standings, see 2007–08 NHL season.

Schedule and results

October

Record: 5–5–0; Home: 3–2–0; Road: 2–3–0

November

Record: 6–6–1; Home: 4–3–0; Road: 2–3–1

December
On December 22, the Sabres won their first shootout victory of the season on the road in Philadelphia against the Philadelphia Flyers. Thomas Vanek scored with 7.2 seconds left in the third period, beating former Sabres goaltender Martin Biron from the right circle to force overtime, and Ales Kotalik of the Sabres scored the only shootout goal to provide the Sabres with a win, adding to their total with six victories in a row.

Record: 8–5–1; Home: 4–2–0; Road: 4–3–1

January

Record: 4–5–4; Home: 1–1–2; Road: 3–4–2

*Played at Ralph Wilson Stadium in Orchard Park, New York.

February

Record: 8–4–3; Home: 5–3–2; Road: 3–1–1

March

Record: 6–5–3; Home: 3–4–2; Road: 3–1–1

April

Record: 2–1–0; Home: 0–0–0; Road: 2–1–0

Playoffs
After winning the Presidents' Trophy in the 2006–07 NHL season, the Sabres failed to qualify for the playoffs despite having 90 points.

Player statistics

Skaters
Note: GP = Games played; G = Goals; A = Assists; Pts = Points; +/- = Plus/minus; PIM = Penalty minutes

*Stats reflect games played with Buffalo only.
 Note: Goaltenders are not assessed plus/minus ratings.

Goaltenders
Note: GP = Games played; TOI = Time on ice (minutes); W = Wins; L = Losses; OTL = Overtime losses; GA = Goals against; SO = Shutouts; SV% = Save percentage; GAA = Goals against average

Awards and records

Records

Milestones

Transactions
The Sabres have been involved in the following transactions during the 2007–08 season.

Trades

Free agents acquired

Draft picks
Buffalo's picks at the 2007 NHL Entry Draft in Columbus, Ohio.

Farm teams

Rochester Americans
The Rochester Americans remain Buffalo's top affiliate in the American Hockey League in 2007–08. It is expected to be the last year of the two teams' long affiliation and the teams are expected to part ways at the end of the season.

See also
 2007–08 NHL season

References

 Player stats: Buffalo Sabres player stats on espn.com
 Schedule: Buffalo Sabres schedule on sabres.com
 Game log: Buffalo Sabres game log on espn.com
 Team standings: NHL standings on espn.com

Buffalo Sabres seasons
Buffalo
Buffalo
Buffalo